Indianapolis Speedway is a 1939 American drama film directed by Lloyd Bacon and written by Sig Herzig and Wally Kline.The film stars Ann Sheridan, Pat O'Brien, John Payne, Gale Page, Frank McHugh and Grace Stafford. The film was released by Warner Bros. on August 5, 1939.

This film is a remake of The Crowd Roars, which starred James Cagney; McHugh repeats his role from the earlier film.

Plot
Two auto racing brothers become rivals on the racetrack when the older brother tries to keep his younger one from dropping out of school and becoming a driver too. The stubborn younger brother just gets behind the wheel of someone else's car and the race is on. During the reckless running of the race, the older brother's best friend is killed precipitating the beginning of the end for the older driver.

Cast 
 Ann Sheridan as 'Frankie' Merrick
 Pat O'Brien as Joe Greer
 John Payne as Eddie Greer
 Gale Page as Lee Mason
 Frank McHugh as 'Spud' Connors
 Grace Stafford as Martha Connors
 Granville Bates as Mr. Greer
 John Ridgely as Ted Horn
 Regis Toomey as Dick Wilbur
 John Harron as Red, Eddie's Pitman
 William B. Davidson as Duncan Martin 
 Edward McWade as Tom Dugan
 Irving Bacon as Fred Haskill
 Tommy Bupp as Haskill's Son
 Robert Middlemass as Edward Hart
 Charles Halton as Mayor

References

External links 
 
 
 
 

1939 films
1930s sports drama films
American sports drama films
Films directed by Lloyd Bacon
Films scored by Adolph Deutsch
American black-and-white films
Remakes of American films
American auto racing films
Films about brothers
Warner Bros. films
1939 drama films
1930s English-language films
1930s American films